Gaius Suetonius Paulinus (fl. AD 40–69) was a Roman general best known as the commander who defeated the rebellion of Boudica.

Early life
Little is known of Suetonius' family, but it likely came from Pisaurum (modern Pesaro), a town on the Adriatic coast of Italy. He is not known to be related to the biographer Suetonius.

Mauretanian campaign
Having served as praetor in 40 AD, Suetonius was appointed governor of Mauretania the following year. In collaboration with Gnaeus Hosidius Geta, he suppressed the revolt led by Aedemon in the mountainous province that arose from the execution of the local ruler by Caligula. In 41 AD Suetonius was the first Roman commander to lead troops across the Atlas Mountains, and Pliny the Elder quotes his description of the area in his Natural History.

Governor of Britain
In 58, before being consul, he was appointed governor of Britain, replacing Quintus Veranius, who had died in office. He continued Veranius's policy of aggressively subduing the tribes of modern Wales, and was successful for his first two years in the post. His reputation as a general came to rival that of Gnaeus Domitius Corbulo. Two future governors served under him: Quintus Petillius Cerialis as legate of Legio IX Hispana, and Gnaeus Julius Agricola as a military tribune attached to II Augusta, but seconded to Suetonius's staff.

In 60 or 61 Suetonius made an assault on the island of Mona (Anglesey), a refuge for British fugitives and a stronghold of the druids. The tribes of the south-east took advantage of his absence and staged a revolt, led by queen Boudica of the Iceni. The colonia of Camulodunum (Colchester) was destroyed, its inhabitants tortured, raped, and slaughtered, and Petillius Cerialis's legion routed. Suetonius brought Mona to terms and marched along the Roman road of Watling Street to Londinium (London), the rebels' next target, but judged he did not have the numbers to defend the city and ordered it evacuated. The Britons duly destroyed it, the citizens of Londinium suffering the same fate as those of Camulodunum, and then did the same to Verulamium (St Albans).

Suetonius regrouped with the XIV Gemina, some detachments of the XX Valeria Victrix, and all available auxiliaries. The II Augusta, based at Exeter, was available, but its prefect, Poenius Postumus, declined to heed the call. Nonetheless, Suetonius was able to assemble a force of about ten thousand men. Heavily outnumbered (the Britons numbered 230,000 according to Cassius Dio), the Romans stood their ground. The resulting battle took place at an unidentified location in a defile with a wood behind him, probably in the West Midlands somewhere along Watling Street – at Cuttle Mill, 2 miles southeast of Towcester in Northamptonshire, in front of a narrow defile which answers the topographical description of Tacitus, human bones have been found over a large area; High Cross in Leicestershire and Manduessedum near the modern day town of Atherstone in Warwickshire have also been suggested - where Roman tactics and discipline triumphed over British numbers. The Britons' flight was impeded by the presence of their own families, whom they had stationed in a ring of wagons at the edge of the battlefield, and defeat turned into slaughter. Tacitus heard reports that almost eighty thousand Britons were killed, compared to only four hundred Romans. Boudica poisoned herself, and Postumus, having denied his men a share in the victory, fell on his sword.

Suetonius reinforced his army with legionaries and auxiliaries from Germania and conducted punitive operations against any remaining pockets of resistance, but this proved counterproductive. The new procurator, Gaius Julius Alpinus Classicianus, expressed concern to the Emperor Nero that Suetonius's activities would only lead to continued hostilities. An inquiry was set up under Nero's freedman, Polyclitus, and an excuse, that Suetonius had lost some ships, was found to relieve him of his command. He was replaced by the more conciliatory Publius Petronius Turpilianus. But Suetonius was not disgraced: a lead tessera found in Rome features both his and Nero's names and symbols of victory, and a man named Gaius Suetonius Paulinus was consul in 66, either a son of the same name  or the general himself appointed for a second time.

Year of Four Emperors
In 69, during the year of civil wars that followed the death of Nero (see Year of Four Emperors), he was one of Otho's senior generals and military advisors. He and Aulus Marius Celsus defeated Aulus Caecina Alienus, one of Vitellius's generals, near Cremona, but Suetonius would not allow his men to follow up their advantage and was accused of treachery as a result. When Caecina joined his forces with those of Fabius Valens, Suetonius advised Otho not to risk a battle but was overruled, leading to Otho's decisive defeat at Bedriacum. Suetonius was captured by Vitellius and obtained a pardon by claiming that he had deliberately lost the battle for Otho, although this was almost certainly untrue. His eventual fate remains unknown.

Notes

References

Roman governors of Britain
Imperial Roman consuls
Ancient Roman generals
Ancient Romans in Britain
People of the Year of the Four Emperors
Suetonii
1st-century Romans